The University of California, Los Angeles (UCLA) is a public land-grant research university in Los Angeles, California. UCLA's academic roots were established in 1881 as a teachers college then known as the southern branch of the California State Normal School (now San José State University). This school was absorbed with the official founding of UCLA as the Southern Branch of the University of California in 1919, making it the second-oldest of the 10-campus University of California system (after UC Berkeley).

UCLA offers 337 undergraduate and graduate degree programs in a wide range of disciplines, enrolling about 31,600 undergraduate and 14,300 graduate and professional students. UCLA received 174,914 undergraduate applications for Fall 2022, including transfers, making the school the most applied-to university in the United States.

The university is organized into the College of Letters and Science and 12 professional schools. Six of the schools offer undergraduate degree programs: Arts and Architecture, Engineering and Applied Science, Music, Nursing, Public Affairs, and Theater, Film and Television. Three others are graduate-level professional health science schools: Medicine, Dentistry, and Public Health. Education & Information Studies, Management, and Law round out the university.

UCLA is considered one of the nation's Public Ivies. , 27 Nobel laureates, five Turing Award winners, two Chief Scientists of the U.S. Air Force and one Fields Medalist have been affiliated with UCLA as faculty, researchers, or alumni. Among the current faculty members, 55 have been elected to the National Academy of Sciences, 32 to the National Academy of Engineering, 41 to the National Academy of Medicine and 167 to the American Academy of Arts and Sciences. The university was elected to the Association of American Universities in 1974.

UCLA student-athletes compete as the Bruins in the Pac-12 Conference. The Bruins have won 120 NCAA team championships, second only to Stanford University's 128 team titles. In total, 410 Bruins have made Olympic teams, winning 270 Olympic medals: 136 gold, 71 silver, and 63 bronze. UCLA has been represented in every Olympics since the university's founding with one exception (1924) and has had a gold medalist in every Olympics the U.S. participated in since 1932.

History

In March 1881, at the request of state senator Reginaldo Francisco del Valle, the California State Legislature authorized the creation of a southern branch of the California State Normal School (now San José State University) in downtown Los Angeles to train teachers for the growing population of Southern California. The Los Angeles branch of the California State Normal School opened on August 29, 1882, on what is now the site of the Central Library of the Los Angeles Public Library system. The facility included a demonstration school where teachers-in-training could practice their techniques with children. That elementary school would become the present day UCLA Lab School. In 1887, the branch campus became independent and changed its name to Los Angeles State Normal School.

In 1914, the school moved to a new campus on Vermont Avenue (now the site of Los Angeles City College) in East Hollywood. In 1917, UC Regent Edward Augustus Dickson, the only regent representing the Southland at the time, and Ernest Carroll Moore, Director of the Normal School, began to lobby the State Legislature to enable the school to become the second University of California campus, after UC Berkeley. They met resistance from UC Berkeley alumni, Northern California members of the state legislature and then-UC President Benjamin Ide Wheeler, who were all vigorously opposed to the idea of a southern campus. However, David Prescott Barrows, the new President of the University of California in 1919, did not share Wheeler's objections.

On May 23, 1919, the Southern Californians' efforts were rewarded when Governor William D. Stephens signed Assembly Bill 626 into law, which acquired the land and buildings and transformed the Los Angeles Normal School into the Southern Branch of the University of California. The same legislation added its general undergraduate program, the Junior College. The Southern Branch campus opened on September 15 of that year, offering two-year undergraduate programs to 250 Junior College students and 1,250 students in the Teachers College, under Moore's continued direction.
Southern Californians were furious that their so-called "branch" provided only an inferior junior college program (mocked at the time by University of Southern California students as "the twig"), and continued to fight Northern Californians (specifically, Berkeley) for the right to three and then four years of instruction, culminating in bachelor's degrees.  On December 11, 1923, the Board of Regents authorized a fourth year of instruction and transformed the Junior College into the College of Letters and Science,  which awarded its first bachelor's degrees on June 12, 1925.

Under UC President William Wallace Campbell, enrollment at the Southern Branch expanded so rapidly that by the mid-1920s the institution was outgrowing the 25 acre Vermont Avenue location. The Regents searched for a new location and announced their selection of the so-called "Beverly Site"—just west of Beverly Hills—on March 21, 1925, edging out the panoramic hills of the still-empty Palos Verdes Peninsula. After the athletic teams entered the Pacific Coast conference in 1926, the Southern Branch student council adopted the nickname "Bruins", a name offered by the student council at UC Berkeley. On February 1, 1927, the Regents renamed the Southern Branch the University of California at Los Angeles (the word "at" was officially replaced by a comma in 1958, in line with other UC campuses). In the same year, the state broke ground in Westwood on land sold for $1 million, less than one-third its value, by real estate developers Edwin and Harold Janss, for whom the Janss Steps are named. The campus in Westwood opened to students in 1929.

The original four buildings were the College Library (now Powell Library), Royce Hall, the Physics-Biology Building (which became the Humanities Building and is now the Renee and David Kaplan Hall), and the Chemistry Building (now Haines Hall), arrayed around a quadrangular courtyard on the 400 acre (1.6 km2) campus. The first undergraduate classes on the new campus were held in 1929 with 5,500 students. After lobbying by alumni, faculty, administration and community leaders, UCLA was permitted to award the master's degree in 1933, and the doctorate in 1936, against continued resistance from UC Berkeley.

Maturity as a university

During its first 32 years, UCLA was treated as an off-site department of UC. As such, its presiding officer was called a "provost", and reported to the main campus in Berkeley. In 1951, UCLA was formally elevated to co-equal status with UC Berkeley, and its presiding officer Raymond B. Allen was the first chief executive to be granted the title of chancellor. The appointment of Franklin David Murphy to the position of Chancellor in 1960 helped spark an era of tremendous growth of facilities and faculty honors. By the end of the decade, UCLA had achieved distinction in a wide range of subjects. This era also secured UCLA's position as a proper university and not simply a branch of the UC system. This change is exemplified by an incident involving Chancellor Murphy, which was described by him:

I picked up the telephone and called in from somewhere, and the phone operator said, "University of California." And I said, "Is this Berkeley?" She said, "No." I said, "Well, who have I gotten to?" "UCLA." I said, "Why didn't you say UCLA?" "Oh", she said, "we're instructed to say University of California." So the next morning I went to the office and wrote a memo; I said, "Will you please instruct the operators, as of noon today, when they answer the phone to say, 'UCLA. And they said, "You know they won't like it at Berkeley." And I said, "Well, let's just see. There are a few things maybe we can do around here without getting their permission."

Recent history

On June 1, 2016, two men were killed in a murder-suicide at an engineering building in the university. School officials put the campus on lockdown as Los Angeles Police Department officers, including SWAT, cleared the campus. In February 2022, Matthew Harris, a former lecturer and postdoctoral fellow at UCLA, was arrested after allegedly making numerous threats of violence against students and faculty members of UCLA's Philosophy Department.

In 2018, a student-led community coalition known as "Westwood Forward" successfully led an effort to break UCLA and Westwood Village away from the existing Westwood Neighborhood Council and form a new North Westwood Neighborhood Council, with over 2,000 out of 3,521 stakeholders voting in favor of the split. Westwood Forward's campaign focused on making housing more affordable and encouraging nightlife in Westwood by opposing many of the restrictions on housing developments and restaurants the Westwood Neighborhood Council had promoted.

In 2022, UCLA signed an agreement to partner with the Tongva for the caretaking and landscaping of various areas of the campus. This included land use for ceremonial events and educational workshops and outreach events.

Sexual harassment scandals
In 2014, a graduate student adviser and professor in the history department, Gabriel Piterberg, was accused of sexually assaulting two students. A lawsuit was filed against the university by sexual harassment attorney Ann Olivarius for its failure to properly act on the accusations. An editorial in the student newspaper wrote about the university's response, "This outcome is an embarrassment for UCLA. Not only does this represent a huge step backward and a betrayal of students’ trust, but it displays a startlingly low standard when it comes to treatment of sexual assault suspects." The university settled with the plaintiffs and eventually, after simply suspending and fining Piterberg, did more after student protest and legal efforts, including "separation from employment, denial of emeritus status, [and] denial of future employment with the University of California."

In 2015, the U.S. Department of Education's Office for Civil Rights investigated UCLA and other universities for their compliance with Title IX and responses to sexual violence.

In 2018, the university came into the national spotlight again when the Los Angeles Times reported that four UCLA employees had filed lawsuits against UCLA and the UC Board of Regents having accused their workplace supervisor of sexual harassment and the university of failing to properly handle abuse complaints. The harassment allegedly started in early 2016, according to the lawsuits. The women faced retaliation from other supervisors after they filed complaints. The retaliatory behavior included making the women do more work and not allowing them to take time off to see their attorney. They are seeking more than $120 million in damages.

Subsequently, an audit by the California State Auditor found inconsistent discipline in UCLA sexual misconduct cases. The state audit also found that UCLA did not follow university policy or Title IX requirements.

2019 college admissions bribery scandal

UCLA was one of several universities named in the largest college admissions scandal ever prosecuted by the United States Department of Justice. On Tuesday, March 12, 2019, UCLA men's soccer coach Jorge Salcedo was one of many coaches across the country charged with racketeering and conspiracy, and is alleged to have taken over $200,000 in bribes. Salcedo pleaded guilty to the charges in April 2020, and in March 2021 was sentenced to, among other things, 8 months in prison.

Campus

The new UCLA campus in 1929 had four buildings: Royce Hall and Haines Hall on the north, and Powell Library and Kinsey Hall (now called Renee And David Kaplan Hall) on the south. The Janss Steps were the original 87-step entrance to the university that lead to the quad of these four buildings. Today, the campus includes 163 buildings across 419 acres (1.7 km2) in the western part of Los Angeles, north of the Westwood shopping district and just south of Sunset Boulevard. In terms of acreage, it is the second-smallest of the ten UC campuses. The campus is approximately 1 mile east of I-405 (the San Diego Freeway).

The campus is in the residential area of Westwood and bordered by Bel-Air to the north, Beverly Hills to the east, and Brentwood to the west. The campus is informally divided into North Campus and South Campus, which are both on the eastern half of the university's land. North Campus is the original campus core; its buildings are more traditional in appearance and clad in imported Italian brick. North Campus is home to the arts, humanities, social sciences, law, history, and business programs and is centered around ficus and sycamore-lined Dickson Court, also known as the "Sunken Garden". South Campus is home to the physical sciences, life sciences, engineering, mathematical sciences, health-related fields, and the UCLA Medical Center. The campus includes sculpture gardens, fountains, museums, and a mix of architectural styles.

Ackerman Union, the John Wooden Center, the Arthur Ashe Health and Wellness Center, the Student Activities Center, Kerckhoff Hall, the J.D. Morgan Center, the James West Alumni Center, and Pauley Pavilion stand at the center of the campus, bordering Wilson Plaza. The campus is bisected by Bruin Walk, a heavily traveled pathway from the residential hill to the main campus. At the intersection of Bruin Walk and Westwood Plaza is Bruin Plaza, featuring an outdoor performing arts stage and a bronze statue of the Bruin bear.

During the 2028 Summer Olympics, wrestling and judo will be held at Pauley Pavilion. The campus will also be the location of the Olympic Village for the Olympic and Paralympic Games.

In September 2022 UCLA purchased the Palos Verdes (PV) campus of Marymount California University, which had closed its doors that August, after fifty years of classes; the PV campus joins two other locations, in downtown LA, and in Culver City as satellites of the Westwood campus. A faculty and administration task force will review possible applications of the PV campus for UCLA. The Channel Islands will again be visible from a UCLA campus.

Architecture

The first buildings were designed by the local firm Allison & Allison. The Romanesque Revival style of these first four structures remained the predominant building style until the 1950s, when architect Welton Becket was hired to supervise the expansion of the campus over the next two decades.

Romanesque Revival was chosen as an alternative to Collegiate Gothic to parallel the climate of Southern California to the warm, sunny weather of the Southern Mediterranean.

Becket greatly streamlined its
general appearance, adding several rows of minimalist, slab–shaped brick buildings to the southern half, the largest of these being the UCLA Medical Center. Architects such as A. Quincy Jones, William Pereira, and Paul Williams designed many subsequent structures on the campus during the mid-20th century. More recent additions include buildings designed by architects I.M. Pei, Venturi, Scott Brown and Associates, Richard Meier, Cesar Pelli, and Rafael Vinoly. To accommodate UCLA's rapidly growing student population, multiple construction and renovation projects are in progress, including expansions of the life sciences and engineering research complexes. This continuous construction gives UCLA the nickname "Under Construction Like Always".

One notable building on campus is named after African-American alumnus Ralph Bunche, who received the 1950 Nobel Peace Prize for negotiating an armistice agreement between the Jews and Arabs in Israel. The entrance of Bunche Hall features a bust of him overlooking the Franklin D. Murphy Sculpture Garden. He was the first individual of non-European background and the first UCLA alumnus to be honored with the Prize.

The Hannah Carter Japanese Garden is located a mile north of campus, in the community of Bel Air. The garden was designed by landscape architect Nagao Sakurai of Tokyo and garden designer Kazuo Nakamura of Kyoto in 1959. The garden was donated to UCLA by former UC regent and UCLA alumnus Edward W. Carter and his wife Hannah Carter in 1964 with the stipulation that it remains open to the public. After the garden was damaged by heavy rains in 1968, UCLA Professor of Art and Campus Architect Koichi Kawana took on the task of its reconstruction. The property was sold in 2016 and public access is no longer required.

Filming

UCLA has attracted filmmakers for decades with its proximity to Hollywood. Much of the film Gotcha! (1985) was shot at UCLA, as well as John Singleton's Higher Learning (1995). Legally Blonde (2001), Old School (2003), The Nutty Professor (1996), Erin Brockovich (2000), How High (2001), National Lampoon's Van Wilder (2002), American Pie 2 (2001), and Bring It On Again (2004) were all mainly shot around campus. In January 2009, the Bollywood movie My Name is Khan (2010) was shot on campus. UCLA is also often cast as Stanford in television shows such as The Mindy Project and Chuck. Some of the exterior shots of the fictional UC Sunnydale in Buffy the Vampire Slayer, and ABC Family original series Greek were also filmed at UCLA. The site was also used to represent the fictional Windsor College which appears in Scream 2 (1997).

In response to the major demand for filming, UCLA has instated a policy to regulate filming and professional photography at the campus.
"UCLA is located in Los Angeles, the same place as the American motion picture industry", said UCLA visiting professor of film and television Jonathan Kuntz. "So we're convenient for (almost) all of the movie companies, TV production companies, commercial companies and so on. We're right where the action is."

Transportation and parking

The campus maintains 24,000 parking spaces, and operates an award-winning sustainable transportation program. Elements of the sustainable transportation program include vanpools, a campus shuttle system called BruinBus, discounted carpool permits, and subsidized transit passes. One of the pass programs includes BruinGo!, which allows students and staff members to purchase discounted passes to ride Santa Monica's Big Blue Bus and the Culver CityBus. Additionally, UCLA has a grocery shuttle that transports students between the dorms and Westwood, on weekends in order to facilitate students' shopping needs.  E-Scooters and e-bikes are popular transportation options on campus; approved vendors include Bird, Lyft, and Wheels.

Academics

Divisions

Undergraduate
 College of Letters and Science
 Social Sciences Division
 Humanities Division
 Physical Sciences Division
 Life Sciences Division
 School of the Arts and Architecture
 School of Education & Information Studies (SEIS)
 Henry Samueli School of Engineering and Applied Science (HSSEAS)
 Herb Alpert School of Music
 School of Theater, Film and Television
 School of Nursing
 Luskin School of Public Affairs

Graduate
 School of Education & Information Studies (SEIS)
 School of Law
 Anderson School of Management
 Luskin School of Public Affairs
 David Geffen School of Medicine
 School of Dentistry
 Jonathan and Karin Fielding School of Public Health

Healthcare

The David Geffen School of Medicine, School of Nursing, School of Dentistry and Fielding School of Public Health constitute the professional schools of health science.

The UCLA Health System operates the Ronald Reagan UCLA Medical Center, a hospital in Santa Monica and twelve primary care clinics throughout Los Angeles County. In addition, the UCLA David Geffen School of Medicine uses two Los Angeles County public hospitals as teaching hospitals—Harbor–UCLA Medical Center and Olive View–UCLA Medical Center—as well as the largest private nonprofit hospital on the west coast, Cedars-Sinai Medical Center. The Greater Los Angeles VA Medical Center is also a major teaching and training site for the university. The UCLA Medical Center made history in 1981 when Assistant Professor Michael Gottlieb first diagnosed AIDS. UCLA medical researchers also pioneered the use of positron emission tomography (PET) scanning to study brain function. Professor of Pharmacology Louis Ignarro was one of the recipients of the 1998 Nobel Prize in Physiology or Medicine for discovering the signaling cascade of nitric oxide, one of the most important molecules in cardiopulmonary physiology.

The U.S. News & World Report Best Hospitals ranking for 2021 ranks UCLA Medical Center 3rd in the United States and 1st in the West. UCLA Medical Center was ranked within the top 20 in the United States for 15 out of 16 medical specialty areas examined.

Research
UCLA is classified among "R1: Doctoral Universities – Very high research activity" and had $1.32 billion in research expenditures in FY 2018.

Rankings

Global

The Times Higher Education World University Rankings for 2017–2018 ranks UCLA 15th in the world for academics, No.1 US Public University for academics, and 13th in the world for reputation. In 2020, it ranked 16th among the universities around the world by SCImago Institutions Rankings. UCLA was ranked 33rd in the QS World University Rankings in 2017 and 12th in the world (10th in North America) by the Academic Ranking of World Universities (ARWU) in 2017. In 2017, the Center for World University Rankings (CWUR) ranked the university 15th in the world based on quality of education, alumni employment, quality of faculty, publications, influence, citations, broad impact, and patents. The 2017 U.S. News & World Report Best Global University Rankings report ranked UCLA 10th in the world. The CWTS Leiden ranking of universities based on scientific impact for 2017 ranks UCLA 14th in the world. The University Ranking by Academic Performance (URAP) conducted by Middle East Technical University for 2016–2017 ranked UCLA 12th in the world based on the quantity, quality and impact of research articles and citations. The Webometrics Ranking of World Universities for 2017 ranked UCLA 11th in the world based on the presence, impact, openness and excellence of its research publications.

National
The 2021 U.S. News & World Report Best Colleges report ranked UCLA first among public universities. The Washington Monthly ranked UCLA 22nd among national universities in 2021, with criteria based on research, community service, and social mobility. The Money Magazine Best Colleges ranking for 2015 ranked UCLA 26th in the United States, based on educational quality, affordability and alumni earnings. In 2014, The Daily Beasts Best Colleges report ranked UCLA 10th in the country. The Kiplinger Best College Values report for 2015 ranked UCLA 6th for value among American public universities. The Wall Street Journal and Times Higher Education ranked UCLA 26th among national universities in 2016. The 2013 Top American Research Universities report by the Center for Measuring University Performance ranks UCLA 11th in power, 12th in resources, faculty, and education, 14th in resources and education and 9th in education. The 2015 Princeton Review College Hopes & Worries Survey ranked UCLA as the No. 5 "Dream College" among students and the No. 10 "Dream College" among parents. The National Science Foundation ranked UCLA 10th among American universities for research and development expenditures in 2014 with $948 million. In 2017 The New York Times ranked UCLA 1st for economic upward-mobility among 65 "elite" colleges in the United States.

Graduate school

, the U.S. News & World Report Best Graduate Schools report ranked the Graduate School of Education and Information Studies (GSEIS) 3rd, the Anderson School of Management 18th, the David Geffen School of Medicine tied for 12th for Primary Care and 21st for Research, the School of Law 14th, the Henry Samueli School of Engineering and Applied Science (HSSEAS) 16th, the Jonathan and Karin Fielding School of Public Health 10th, and the School of Nursing 16th. The QS Global 200 MBA Rankings report for 2015 ranks the Anderson School of Management 9th among North American business schools. The 2014 Economist ranking of Full-time MBA programs ranks the Anderson School of Management 13th in the world. The 2014 Financial Times ranking of MBA programs ranks the Anderson School 26th in the world. The 2014 Bloomberg Businessweek ranking of Full-time MBA programs ranks the Anderson School of Management 11th in the United States. The 2014 Business Insider ranking of the world's best business schools ranks the Anderson School of Management 20th in the world. The 2014 Eduniversal Business Schools Ranking ranks the Anderson School of Management 15th in the United States. In 2015, career website Vault ranked the Anderson School of Management 16th among American business schools, and the School of Law 15th among American law schools. In 2015, financial community website QuantNet ranked the Anderson School of Management's Master of Financial Engineering program 12th among North American financial engineering programs.

The U.S. News & World Report Best Online Programs report for 2016 ranked the Henry Samueli School of Engineering and Applied Science (HSSEAS) 1st among online graduate engineering programs.

Departmental
Departments ranked in the national top ten by the 2016 U.S. News & World Report Best Graduate Schools report are Clinical Psychology (1st), Fine Arts (2nd), Psychology (2nd), Medical School: Primary Care (6th), Math (7th), History (9th), Sociology (9th), English (10th), Political Science (10th), and Public Health (10th).

Departments ranked in the global top ten by the 2016 U.S. News & World Report Best Global Universities report are Arts and Humanities (7th), Biology and Biochemistry (10th), Chemistry (6th), Clinical Medicine (10th), Materials Science (10th), Mathematics (7th), Neuroscience and Behavior (7th), Psychiatry/Psychology (3rd) and Social Sciences and Public Health (8th).

Departments ranked in the global top ten by the Academic Ranking of World Universities (ARWU) for 2015 are Mathematics (8th) and Computer Science (9th).

Departments ranked in the global top ten by the QS World University Rankings for 2020 are English Language & Literature (9th), Linguistics (10th), Modern Languages (7th), Medicine (7th), Psychology (6th), Mathematics (9th), Geography (5th), Communications & Media Studies (13th), Education (11th) and Sociology (7th).

Academic field
Academic field rankings in the global top ten according to the Academic Ranking of World Universities (ARWU) for 2015 are Clinical Medicine and Pharmacy (10th).

Academic field rankings in the global top ten according to the Times Higher Education World University Rankings for 2014–2015 include Arts & Humanities (10th), Clinical, Pre-clinical and Health (9th), Engineering and Technology (9th), Physical Sciences (9th), and Social Sciences (9th).

Academic field rankings in the global top ten according to the QS World University Rankings for 2015 are Arts & Humanities (10th) and Life Sciences and Medicine (10th).

Student body
The Institute of International Education ranked UCLA the American university with the seventh-most international students in 2016 (behind NYU, USC, Arizona State, Columbia University, The University of Illinois, and Northeastern University). In 2014, Business Insider ranked UCLA 5th in the world for the number of alumni working at Google (behind Stanford, Berkeley, Carnegie Mellon, and MIT). In 2015, Business Insider ranked UCLA 10th among American universities with the most students hired by Silicon Valley companies. In 2015, research firm PitchBook ranked UCLA 9th in the world for venture capital raised by undergraduate alumni, and 11th in the world for producing the most MBA graduate alumni who are entrepreneurs backed by venture capital.

Library system

UCLA's library system has over nine million books and 70,000 serials spread over twelve libraries and eleven other archives, reading rooms, and research centers. It is the United States' 12th largest library in number of volumes.

The first library, University Library (presently Powell Library), was founded in 1884. In 1910, Elizabeth Fargo became the university's first librarian. Lawrence Powell became librarian in 1944, and began a series of system overhauls and modifications, and in 1959, was named Dean of the School of Library Service. More libraries were added as previous ones filled. Page Ackerman became University Librarian in 1973 and was the nation's first female librarian of a system as large and complex as UCLA's. She oversaw the first coordinations between other UC schools, and formed a new administrative network that is still in use today. Since her retirement, the system has seen steady growth and improvement under various librarians. The present University Librarian is Virginia Steel, who took office on July 15, 2013.

Medical school admissions

According to the Association of American Medical Colleges (AAMC), UCLA supplies the most undergraduate applicants to U.S. medical schools among all American universities. In 2015, UCLA supplied 961 medical school applicants, followed by UC Berkeley with 819 and the University of Florida with 802.

Among first-time medical school applicants who received their bachelor's degree from UCLA in 2014, 51% were admitted to at least one U.S. medical school.

Admissions

Undergraduate

U.S. News & World Report rates UCLA "Most Selective" and The Princeton Review rates its admissions selectivity of 98 out of 99. 149,815 prospective freshmen applied for Fall 2021, the most of any four-year university in the United States.

Admission rates vary according to the residency of applicants. For Fall 2019, California residents had an admission rate of 12.0%, while out-of-state U.S. residents had an admission rate of 16.4% and internationals had an admission rate of 8.4%. UCLA's overall freshman admit rate for the Fall 2019 term was 12.3%.

As of 2020, the basis for selection at UCLA includes several academic and nonacademic factors. Those considered "very important" are all academic; they are rigor of secondary school record, academic GPA, standardized test scores, and application essay(s). Those considered "important" are talent/ability, character/personal qualities, volunteer work, work experience, and extracurricular activities. Factors that are not considered at all include class rank, interviews, alumni relation, and racial/ethnic status.

Enrolled freshman for Fall 2019 had an unweighted GPA of 3.90, an SAT interquartile range of 1280–1510, and an ACT interquartile range of 27–34. The SAT interquartile ranges were 640–740 for reading/writing and 640–790 for math. Among the admitted freshman applicants for the Fall 2019 term, 43.1% chose to enroll at UCLA.

UCLA's freshman admission rate varies drastically across colleges. For Fall 2016, the College of Letters and Science had an admission rate of 21.2%, the Henry Samueli School of Engineering and Applied Science (HSSEAS) had an admission rate of 12.4%, the Herb Alpert School of Music had an admission rate of 23.5%, the School of the Arts and Architecture had an admission rate of 10.3%, the School of Nursing had an admission rate of 2.2%, and the School of Theater, Film and Television had an admission rate of 4.4%.

One of the major issues is the decreased admission of African-Americans since the passage of Proposition 209 in 1996, prohibiting state governmental institutions from considering race, sex, or ethnicity, specifically in the areas of public employment, public contracting, and public education. UCLA responded by shifting to a holistic admissions process starting Fall 2007. The holistic admissions process evaluates applicants based on their opportunities in high school, their personal hardships and unusual circumstances at home.

Graduate

For Fall 2020, the David Geffen School of Medicine admitted 2.9% of its applicants, making it the 8th most selective U.S. medical school. The School of Law had a median undergraduate GPA of 3.82 and median Law School Admission Test (LSAT) score of 170 for the enrolled class of 2024. The Anderson School of Management had a middle-80% GPA range of 3.1–3.8 and an average Graduate Management Admission Test (GMAT) score of 711 for the enrolled MBA class of 2024.

The School of Dentistry had an average overall GPA of 3.65, an average science GPA of 3.6 and an average Dental Admissions Test (DAT) score of 22.8 for the enrolled class of 2025. The Graduate School of Nursing currently has an acceptance rate of 33%. For Fall 2020, the Henry Samueli School of Engineering and Applied Science (HSSEAS) had a graduate acceptance rate of 27%.

Economic impact
The university has a significant impact in the Los Angeles economy. It is the fifth largest employer in the county (after Los Angeles County, the Los Angeles Unified School District, the federal government and the City of Los Angeles) and the seventh largest in the region.

Trademarks and licensing
The UCLA trademark "is the exclusive property of the Regents of the University of California", but it is managed, protected, and licensed through UCLA Trademarks and Licensing, a division of the Associated Students UCLA, the largest student employer on campus. As such, the ASUCLA also has a share in the profits.

Due to UCLA's academic and athletic prestige, as well as the name, being associated with popular images of Southern California lifestyle, apparel with UCLA logos and insignia sells not just in the United States, but as an overseas clothing and accessories brand. High demand for UCLA apparel has inspired the licensing of its trademark to UCLA brand stores throughout Europe, the Middle East and Asia. Since 1980, 15 UCLA stores have opened in South Korea, and 49 are currently open in China. The newest store was opened in Kuwait. There are also stores in Mexico, Singapore, India and Europe. UCLA makes $400,000 in royalties every year through its international licensing program.

Commerce on campus

UCLA has various store locations around campus, with the main store in Ackerman Union. In addition, UCLA-themed products are sold at the gift shop of Fowler Museum on campus.

Due to licensing and trademarks, products with UCLA logos and insignia are usually higher priced than their unlicensed counterparts. These products have popularity among visitors, who buy them as gifts and souvenirs. For certain products (such as notebooks and folders) the UCLA Store offers both licensed (logo) and unlicensed (without logo, thus cheaper) options, but for many other products the latter option is often unavailable.

Students who are part-time employed by ASUCLA at a UCLA Store or a UCLA Restaurant are offered certain discounts when they are shopping at UCLA Stores, in addition to their salary.

Athletics

The school's sports teams are called the Bruins, represented by the colors true blue and gold. The Bruins participate in NCAA Division I as part of the Pac-12 Conference. Two notable sports facilities serve as home venues for UCLA sports. The Bruin men's football team plays home games at the Rose Bowl in Pasadena; the team won a national title in 1954. The basketball and volleyball teams, and the women's gymnastics team compete at Pauley Pavilion on campus. The school also sponsors cross country, soccer, women's rowing, golf, tennis, water polo, track and field, and women's softball.

The mascots are Joe and Josephine Bruin, and the fight songs are Sons of Westwood and Mighty Bruins. The alma mater is Hail to the Hills of Westwood.

When Henry "Red" Sanders came to UCLA to coach football in 1949, the uniforms were redesigned. Sanders added a gold loop on the shoulders—the UCLA Stripe. The navy blue was changed to a lighter shade of blue. Sanders figured that the baby blue would look better on the field and in film. He dubbed the uniform "Powder Keg Blue", a powder blue with an explosive kick. This would also differentiate UCLA from all other UC teams, whose official colors are blue and gold.

UCLA competes in all major Division I sports and has won 128 national championships, including 119 NCAA championships. Only Stanford University has more NCAA team championships, with 126. On April 21, 2018, UCLA's women's gymnastics team defeated Oklahoma Sooners to win its 7th NCAA National Championship as well as UCLA's 115th overall team title. Most recently, UCLA's women's soccer team defeated Florida State to win its first NCAA National Championship along with women's tennis who defeated North Carolina to win its second NCAA National title ever. UCLA's softball program is also outstanding. Women's softball won their NCAA-leading 12th National Championship, on June 4, 2019. The women's water polo team is also dominant, with a record 7 NCAA championships. Notably, the team helped UCLA become the first school to win 100 NCAA championships overall when they won their fifth on May 13, 2007.

The men's water polo team won UCLA's 112th, 113th, and 114th national championships, defeating USC in the championship game three times: on December 7, 2014, on December 6, 2015, and on December 3, 2017. On October 9, 2016, the top-ranked men's water polo team broke the NCAA record for consecutive wins when they defeated UC Davis for their 52nd straight win. This toppled Stanford's previous record of 51 consecutive wins set in 1985–87. The men's water polo team has become a dominant sport on campus with a total of 11 national championships.

Among UCLA's 118 championship titles, some of the more notable victories are in men's basketball. Under legendary coach John Wooden, UCLA men's basketball teams won 10 NCAA championships, including a record seven consecutive, in 1964, 1965, 1967–1973, and 1975, and an 11th was added under then-coach Jim Harrick in 1995 (through 2008, the most consecutive by any other team is two). From 1971 to 1974, UCLA men's basketball won an unprecedented 88 consecutive games.
UCLA has also shown dominance in men's volleyball, with 19 national championships. All 19 teams were led by former coach Al Scates, which ties him with John McDonnell of the University of Arkansas as NCAA leader for national championships in a single sport.

UCLA is one of only six universities (Michigan, Stanford, Ohio State, California, and Florida being the others) to have won national championships in all three major men's sports (baseball, basketball, and football).

USC rivalry

UCLA shares a traditional sports rivalry with the University of Southern California. UCLA teams have won the second-most NCAA Division I-sanctioned team championships, while USC has the third-most.  Only Stanford University, a fellow Pac-12 member also located in California, has more than either UCLA or USC. The football rivalry is distinctive for two of the strongest conference programs located in one city. In football, UCLA has one national champion team and 16 conference titles, compared to USC's 11 national championships and 37 conference championships. The two football teams compete for annual possession of the Victory Bell, the trophy of the rivalry football game.

The schools share a rivalry in many other sports, and are each the best in the nation for many. UCLA has won 19 NCAA Championships in men's volleyball,  11 in men's basketball,  12 in Softball, and 7 in women's water polo, the most of any school in those sports. USC has won 26 NCAA Championships in Men's Outdoor Track and Field, 21 in men's tennis, and 12 in baseball, also the most of any school in each respective sport.

The annual SoCal BMW Crosstown Cup compares the two schools based on their performance in 19 varsity sports; UCLA has won five times and USC has won nine times. This rivalry extends to the Olympic Games, where UCLA athletes have won 250 medals over a span of 50 years while USC athletes have won 287 over 100 years.

UCLA and USC also compete in the We Run The City 5K, an annual charity race to raise donations for Special Olympics Southern California. The race is located on the campus of one of the schools and switches to the other campus each year. USC won the race in 2013 and 2015, while UCLA won the race in 2012, 2014, 2016, and 2017.

Student life 

The campus is located near prominent entertainment venues such as the Getty Center, the Los Angeles County Museum of Art (LACMA) and the Santa Monica Pier. UCLA offers classical orchestras, intramural sports, and over 1000 student organizations  UCLA is also home to 66 fraternities and sororities, which represent 13% of the undergraduate population. Phrateres, a non-exclusive social-service club for women was founded here in 1924 by the Dean of Women, Helen Matthewson Laughlin. Students and staff participate in dinghy sailing, surfing, windsurfing, rowing, and kayaking at the UCLA Marina Aquatic Center in Marina del Rey.

UCLA is home to a slew of performing arts groups, including an improv comedy team called Rapid Fire. UCLA's first contemporary a cappella group, Awaken A Cappella, was founded in 1992. The all-male group, Bruin Harmony, has enjoyed a successful career since its inception in 2006, portraying a collegiate a cappella group in The Social Network (2010), while the ScatterTones finished in second-place in the International Championship of Collegiate A Cappella (ICCA) in 2012, 2013, and 2014, and third-place in 2017, 2019, and 2022. In 2020, The A Cappella Archive ranked the ScatterTones at #2 among all ICCA-competing groups. Resonance, founded in 2012, was an ICCA finalist in 2021. Other a cappella groups include Signature, Random Voices, Medleys, YOUTHphonics, Deviant Voices, AweChords, Pitch Please, Da Verse, Naya Zaamana, Jewkbox, On That Note, Tinig Choral, and Cadenza. YOUTHphonics and Medleys are UCLA's only nonprofit service-oriented a cappella groups.

There are a variety of cultural organizations on campus, such as Nikkei Student Union (NSU), Japanese Student Association (JSA), Association of Chinese Americans (ACA), Chinese Students and Scholars Association (CSSA), Chinese Music Ensemble (CME), Chinese Cultural Dance Club (CCDC), Taiwanese American Union (TAU), Taiwanese Student Association (TSA), Hong Kong Student Society (HKSS), Hanoolim Korean Cultural Awareness Group, Samahang Pilipino, Vietnamese Student Union (VSU), and Thai Smakom. Many of these organizations have an annual "culture night" consisting of drama and dance which raises awareness of culture and history to the campus and community.

Additionally, there are over 20 LGBTQ organizations on campus, including the undergraduate student organizations Queer Alliance, BlaQue, Lavender Health Alliance, OutWrite Newsmagazine, Queer and Trans in STEM (qtSTEM), and Transgender UCLA Pride (TransUP) as well as the graduate student organizations Out@Anderson, OUTLaw, and Luskin PRIDE. Notably, OutWrite, established under the name TenPercent in 1979, is the first college queer newsmagazine in the country.

UCLA operates on a quarter calendar with the exception of the UCLA School of Law and the UCLA School of Medicine, which operate on a semester calendar.

Greek life
There are more than 65 inter/national and local Greek-letter organizations at UCLA in six governing councils; Asian Greek Council (AGC), Interfraternity Greek Council (IFC), Latino Greek Council (LGC), Multi-Interest Greek Council (MIGC), National Pan-Hellenic Council (NPHC), and Panhellenic Council (Panhel). Approximately 3,800 undergraduate students (13%) are involved in UCLA Greek life.

Asian Greek Council (AGC):
Governing body of the 4 historically Asian-founded fraternities and sororities.
Latino Greek Council (LGC):
Governing body of the 8 Latino/a founded Greek-letter organizations.
Multi-Interest Greek Council (MIGC):
Governing body of the 15 cultural-based/special-interest fraternity and sorority organizations.
National Pan-Hellenic Council (NPHC):
Governing body of the 7 historically African American Greek-letter organizations at UCLA.

Traditions

UCLA's official charity is UniCamp, founded in 1934. It is a week-long summer camp for under-served children from the greater Los Angeles area, with UCLA volunteer counselors. UniCamp runs for seven weeks throughout the summer at Camp River Glen in the San Bernardino National Forest. Because UniCamp is a non-profit organization, student volunteers from UCLA also fundraise money throughout the year to allow these children to attend summer camp.

True Bruin Welcome begins the fall quarter to introduce new students to clubs and activities. The week includes the Day of Service for all freshmen, the Enormous Activities Fair, and the Sports Fair. At the end of move-in and the beginning of True Bruin Welcome, UCLA holds Bruin Bash, which includes a concert, dance and movie pre-release. Bruin Bash was created as a replacement for Black Sunday, a large-scale day of partying including all fraternities in North Westwood Village.

The Pediatric AIDS Coalition organizes the annual Dance Marathon in Pauley Pavilion, where thousands of students raise a minimum of $250 and dance for 26 hours to support the Elizabeth Glaser Pediatric AIDS Foundation, Project Kindle, and the UCLA AIDS Institute. Dancers are not allowed to sit (except to use the restroom) during the marathon, literally taking a stand against pediatric AIDS, and symbolizing the suffering of affected children around the world. In 2015, Dance Marathon at UCLA raised $446,157.

During Finals Week, UCLA students participate in "Midnight Yell", where they yell as loudly as possible for a few minutes at midnight to release some stress from studying. The quarterly Undie Run takes place during the Wednesday evening of Finals Week, when students run through the campus in their underwear or in skimpy costumes. The run began in Fall of 2001 when a student, Eric Whitehead, wearing what he described as "really short shorts" walked around singing and playing guitar to protest the police restrictions on the Midnight Yell. With the increasing safety hazards and Police and Administration involvement, a student committee changed the route to a run through campus to Shapiro Fountain, which now culminates with students dancing in the fountain. In 2007, the route was changed again to begin at Strathmore Avenue instead of Landfair Avenue. The Undie Run has spread to other American universities, including the University of Texas at Austin, Arizona State University, and Syracuse University.

The Alumni Association sponsors several events, usually large extravaganzas involving huge amounts of coordination, such as the 70-year-old Spring Sing, organized by the Student Alumni Association (SAA). UCLA's oldest tradition, Spring Sing is an annual gala of student talent, which is held at either Pauley Pavilion or the outdoor Los Angeles Tennis Center. The committee bestows the George and Ira Gershwin Lifetime Achievement Award each year to a major contributor to the music industry. Past recipients have included Stevie Wonder, Frank Sinatra, Ella Fitzgerald, James Taylor, Ray Charles, Natalie Cole, Quincy Jones, Lionel Richie, and in 2009, Julie Andrews. The Dinner for 12 Strangers is a gathering of students, alumni, administration and faculty to network around different interests. The "Beat 'SC Bonfire and Rally" occurs the week before the USC rivalry football game.

The USAC Cultural Affairs Commission hosts the JazzReggae Festival, a two-day concert on Memorial Day weekend that attracts more than 20,000 attendees. The JazzReggae Festival is the largest, entirely student produced and run event of its kind on the West Coast.

Sigma Eta Pi and Bruin Entrepreneurs organize LA Hacks, an annual hackathon where students from around the United States come to build technology products. LA Hacks established itself as the largest hackathon in the United States when over 1500 students participated on April 11–13, 2014. LA Hacks also holds the record for the most funds raised via corporate sponsorships with $250,000 raised. Some of the tech world's most prominent people have given talks and judged projects at LA Hacks, including Evan Spiegel (Founder and CEO of Snapchat), Alexis Ohanian (co-founder of Reddit), Sam Altman (President of Y Combinator) and Chris De Wolfe (Founder of Myspace).

Student government

The Associated Students UCLA (ASUCLA) encompasses the student government and student-led enterprises at UCLA. ASUCLA has four major components: the Undergraduate Students Association, the Graduate Students Association, Student Media, and Services & Enterprises. However, in common practice, the term ASUCLA refers to the services and enterprises component. This includes the Student Store, Bookstore, Food Services, Student Union, etc. These commercial enterprises generate approximately $40 million in annual revenues. As a nonprofit corporation, the financial goal of ASUCLA is to provide quality services and programs for students. ASUCLA is governed by a student-majority Board of Directors. The Undergraduate Students Association and Graduate Students Association each appoint three members plus one alternative. In addition to the student members, there are representatives appointed by the administration, the academic senate, and the alumni association. The "services and enterprises" portion of ASUCLA is run by a professional executive director who oversees some 300 staff and 2,000 student employees.

The Graduate Students Association is the governing body for approximately 13,000 graduate and professional students at UCLA.

The Undergraduate Students Association Council (USAC) is the governing body of the Undergraduate Students Association (USA) whose membership comprises every UCLA undergraduate student. , the student body had two major political slates: Bruins United and Let's Act. In the Spring 2016 election, the two competing parties were Bruins United and Waves of Change—a smaller faction that broke off of Lets Act.

USAC's fourteen student officers and commissioners are elected by members of the Undergraduate Students Association at an annual election held during Spring Quarter. In addition to its fourteen elected members, USAC includes appointed representatives of the Administration, the Alumni, and the Faculty, as well as two ex-officio members, the ASUCLA Executive Director and a student Finance Committee Chairperson who is appointed by the USA President and approved by USAC. All members of USAC may participate fully in Council deliberations, but only the elected officers, minus the USAC President may vote.

Along with the council, the student government also includes a seven-member Judicial Board, which similar to the Supreme Court, serves as the judicial branch of government and reviews actions of the council. These seven students are appointed by the student body president and confirmed by the council.

USAC's programs offers additional services to the campus and surrounding communities. For example, each year approximately 40,000 students, faculty and staff attend programs of the Campus Events Commission, including a low-cost film program, a speakers program which presents leading figures from a wide range of disciplines, and performances by dozens of entertainers. Two to three thousand UCLA undergraduates participate annually in the more than twenty voluntary outreach programs run by the Community Service Commission. A large corps of undergraduate volunteers also participate in programs run by the Student Welfare Commission, such as AIDS Awareness, Substance Abuse Awareness, Blood Drives and CPR/First Aid Training.

The film program is part of the Bruin Film Society, which is also a registered organization to host advance screenings of films during Oscars season. It hosts other events, like filmmaker panels, through its partnership with production and distribution company A24.

Media publications
UCLA Student Media is the home of UCLA's newspaper, magazines, and radio station. Most student media publications are governed by the ASUCLA Communications Board.

The Daily Bruin is UCLA's most prominent student publication. Founded in 1919 under the name Cub Californian, it has since then developed into Los Angeles' third-most circulated newspaper. It has won dozens of national awards, and is regularly commended for layout and content. In 2016, the paper won two National Pacemaker Awards – one for the best college newspaper in the country, and another for the best college media website in the country. The newspaper has not been without scrutiny and controversy, and in 1954, the administration attempted to intervene with the previous policy of electing editors by a student council.

UCLA Student Media also publishes seven special-interest news magazines: Al-Talib, Fem, Ha'Am, La Gente, Nommo, Pacific Ties, and OutWrite, a school yearbook, BruinLife, and the student-run radio station, UCLA Radio.

Student groups such as The Forum for Energy Economics and Development also publish yearly journals focused on energy technologies and industries. There are also numerous graduate student-run journals at UCLA, such as Carte Italiane, Issues in Applied Linguistics, and Mediascape. Many of these publications are available through open access. The School of Law publishes the UCLA Law Review which is currently ranked seventh among American law schools.

Housing

UCLA provides housing to over 10,000 undergraduate and 2,900 graduate students.

Most undergraduate students are housed in 14 complexes on the western side of campus, referred to by students as "The Hill". Students can live in halls, plazas, suites, or university apartments, which vary in pricing and privacy. Housing plans also offer students access to dining facilities, which have been ranked by the Princeton Review as some of the best in the United States. Dining halls are located in Covel Commons, Rieber Hall, Carnesale Commons and De Neve Plaza. In winter 2012, a dining hall called The Feast at Rieber opened to students. The newest dining hall (as of Winter Quarter 2014) is Bruin Plate, located in the Carnesale Commons (commonly referred to as Sproul Plaza). Residential cafes include Bruin Cafe, Rendezvous, The Study at Hedrick, and Cafe 1919. UCLA currently offers three years guaranteed housing to its incoming freshmen, and one year to incoming transfer students. There are four type of housing available for students: residential halls, deluxe residential halls, residential plazas, and residential suites. Available on the hill are study rooms, basketball courts, tennis courts, and Sunset Recreational Center which includes three swimming pools.

Graduate students are housed in one of five apartment complexes. Weyburn Terrace is located just southwest of the campus in Westwood Village. The other four are roughly five miles south of UCLA in Palms and Mar Vista. They too vary in pricing and privacy. Approximately 400 students live at the University Cooperative Housing Association, located two blocks off campus.

Students who are involved in Greek life have the option to also live in Greek housing while at UCLA. Sorority houses are located east of campus on Hilgard Avenue, and fraternity houses are located west of campus throughout Westwood Village. A student usually lives with 50+ students in Greek housing.

Hospitality
Hospitality constituents of the university include departments not directly related to student life or administration. The Hospitality department manages the university's two on-campus hotels, the UCLA Guest House and the Meyer and Renee Luskin Conference Center. The 61-room Guest House services those visiting the university for campus-related activities. The department also manages the UCLA Conference Center, a 40-acre (0.2 km2) conference center in the San Bernardino Mountains near Lake Arrowhead. Hospitality also operates UCLA Catering, a vending operation, and a summer conference center located on the Westwood campus.

Chabad House
The UCLA Chabad House is a community center for Jewish students operated by the Orthodox Jewish Chabad movement. Established in 1969, it was the first Chabad House at a university. In 1980, three students died in a fire in the original building of the UCLA Chabad House. The present building was erected in their memory. The building, completed in 1984, was the first of many Chabad houses worldwide designed as architectural reproductions of the residence of the Lubavitcher Rebbe, Rabbi Menachem Mendel Schneerson at 770 Eastern Parkway in Brooklyn, New York. The Chabad House hosts the UCLA chapter of The Rohr Jewish Learning Institute's Sinai Scholars Society.

Healthy Campus Initiative
In January 2013, Chancellor Gene Block launched the UCLA Healthy Campus Initiative (HCI), envisioned and supported by Jane and Terry Semel. The Semel HCI prioritizes the health and wellness of UCLA students, staff, and faculty by "making the healthy choice the easy choice." The goal of the initiative is to make UCLA the healthiest campus in the country, and to share best practices and research with other communities, locally and beyond.

The initiative is a campuswide, multi-year effort that champions programs such as the tobacco-free policy, expansion of campus gardens, stairwell makeovers, bicycle infrastructure improvements, healthy and sustainable dining options, and peer counseling, among others.

The UCLA Healthy Campus Initiative is credited with providing inspiration for national initiatives including the Partnership for a Healthier America (PHA) Healthier Campus Initiative and the University of California Office of the President (UCOP) Global Food Initiative (GFI). In November 2014, UCLA was one of the 20 inaugural colleges and universities to pledge to adopt PHA's guidelines for food and nutrition, physical activity and programming over three years. The Semel HCI is a member of both the Menus of Change Research Collaborative and the Teaching Kitchen Collaborative, and a contributor to The Huffington Post.

Faculty and alumni 

As of October 2021, 28 Nobel laureates have been affiliated with UCLA: 12 professors, 8 alumni and 10 researchers (three overlaps).

Two other faculty members winning the Nobel Prize were Bertrand Russell and Al Gore, who each had a short stay at UCLA.

The alumni Nobel laureates include Richard Heck (Chemistry, 2010); Elinor Ostrom (Economic Sciences, 2009); and Randy Schekman (Physiology or Medicine, 2013). Fifty-two UCLA professors have been awarded Guggenheim Fellowships, and eleven are MacArthur Foundation Fellows. Mathematics professor Terence Tao was awarded the 2006 Fields Medal.

Geography professor Jared Diamond won the 1998 Pulitzer Prize for his book Guns, Germs, and Steel. Two UCLA history professors have each won 2008 Pulitzer Prizes for general nonfiction and history. Saul Friedländer, noted scholar of the Nazi Holocaust, won the prize for general nonfiction for his 2006 book, The Years of Extermination: Nazi Germany and the Jews, 1939–1945, and Daniel Walker Howe for his 2007 book, What Hath God Wrought: The Transformation of America, 1815–1848.

A number of UCLA alumni are notable politicians. In the State of Hawaii, Ben Cayetano ('68), became the first Filipino American to be elected Governor of a U.S. state. In the U.S. House of Representatives, Henry Waxman ('61, '64) represented California's 30th congressional district and was Chairman of the House Energy and Commerce Committee. U.S. Representative Judy Chu ('74) represents California's 32nd congressional district and became the first Chinese American woman elected to the U.S. Congress in 2009. Kirsten Gillibrand ('91) is U.S. Senator from the State of New York and former U.S. Representative for New York's 20th congressional district. UCLA boasts two Mayors of Los Angeles: Tom Bradley (1937–1940), the city's only African-American mayor, and Antonio Villaraigosa ('77), who served as mayor from 2005 to 2013. Nao Takasugi was the mayor of Oxnard, California and the first Asian-American California assemblyman. Azadeh Kian, PhD at UCLA and Director of social sciences at University of Paris, is a prominent expert on Iranian politics.

H. R. Haldeman ('48) and John Ehrlichman ('48) are among the most infamous alumni because of their activities during the 1972 Watergate Scandal.

Ben Shapiro (BA '04) is an American conservative political commentator, nationally syndicated columnist, author, radio talk show host, and attorney. He is the editor-in-chief at The Daily Wire.

Michael Morhaime (BA '90), Allen Adham (BA '90) and Frank Pearce (BA '90) are the founders of Blizzard Entertainment, developer of the award-winning Warcraft, StarCraft and Diablo computer game franchises. Tom Anderson (MA '00) is a co-founder of the social networking website Myspace. Computer scientist Vint Cerf ('70, '72) is vice president and Chief Internet Evangelist at Google and the person most widely considered the "father of the Internet." Henry Samueli ('75) is co-founder of Broadcom Corporation and owner of the Anaheim Ducks. Susan Wojcicki (MBA '98) is the former CEO of YouTube. Travis Kalanick is one of the founders of Uber. Guy Kawasaki (MBA '79) is one of the earliest employees at Apple. Nathan Myhrvold is the founder of Microsoft Research.

Bill Gross (MBA '71) co-founded Pacific Investment Management (PIMCO). Laurence Fink (BA '74, MBA '76) is chairman and CEO of the world's largest money-management firm BlackRock. Donald Prell (BA '48) is a venture capitalist and founder of Datamation computer magazine. Ben Horowitz (MS '90) is a co-founder of the Silicon Valley venture capital firm Andreessen Horowitz.

UCLA alumni have also achieved prominence in the arts and entertainment. John Williams is laureate conductor at the Boston Pops Orchestra and Academy Award-winning composer of the Star Wars film score. Martin Sherwin ('71) was awarded the Pulitzer Prize for American Prometheus: The Triumph and Tragedy of J. Robert Oppenheimer. Actors Ben Stiller, Tim Robbins, James Franco, George Takei, Mayim Bialik, Sean Astin, Holland Roden, Danielle Panabaker, and Milo Ventimiglia are also UCLA alumni. Popular music artists Sara Bareilles, The Doors, Linkin Park, and Maroon 5 all attended UCLA. Ryan Dusick of Maroon 5 majored in English. Giada De Laurentiis is a program host at Food Network and former chef at Spago. Greg Graffin, lead singer of punk rock band Bad Religion, earned a master's degree in geology at UCLA, and used to teach a course on evolution there. Carol Burnett was the winner of the Mark Twain Prize for American Humor in 2013 (also winner of Emmys, a Peabody and a Presidential Medal of Freedom in 2005). Francis Ford Coppola ('67) was the director of the gangster film trilogy The Godfather, The Outsiders starring Tom Cruise, and the Vietnam War film Apocalypse Now and Dustin Lance Black is the Academy Award-winning screenwriter of the film Milk.

Meb Keflezighi ('98) is the winner of the 2014 Boston Marathon and the 2004 Olympic silver medalist in the marathon. The UCLA men's basketball team has produced Basketball Hall of Fame players such as Bill Walton and Kareem Abdul-Jabbar as well as current NBA players Kevin Love and Russell Westbrook. Noted Bruins baseball players include Troy Glaus, Chase Utley, Brandon Crawford, Gerrit Cole, and Trevor Bauer. Los Angeles Dodgers manager Dave Roberts won World Series titles as a member of the 2004 Boston Red Sox and in 2020 as manager of the Dodgers.

UCLA also boasts an excellent military background, with hundreds of alumni serving their nation. Carlton Skinner was a U.S. Coast Guard Commander who racially integrated that service at the end of World War II on the Sea Cloud. He was also the first civilian governor of Guam. Francis B. Wai is, to date, the only Chinese-American and the first Asian-American to be awarded the Congressional Medal of Honor for his actions in World War II. UCLA also lost an alumnus in early 2007 when Second Lieutenant Mark Daily was killed in Mosul, Iraq after his HMMWV was hit by an IED. Lieutenant Daily's service is marked by a plaque located on the northern face of the Student Activities Center (SAC), where the ROTC halls are currently located.

UCLA's faculty and alumni have won a number of awards including:

 105 Academy Awards
 278 Emmy Awards
 1 Fields Medal
 3 Turing Awards
 11 Fulbright Scholars (since 2000)
 78 Guggenheim Fellows
 50 Grammy Awards
 12 MacArthur Fellows
 1 Mark Twain Prize for American Humor
 10 National Medals of Science
 16 Nobel Laureates
 3 Presidential Medals of Freedom
 1 Pritzker Prize in Architecture
 3 Pulitzer Prizes
 1 Rome Prize in Design
 12 Rhodes Scholars
 1 Medal of Honor
 2 Mitchell Scholars

As of August 1, 2016, the top three places where UCLA alumni work are Kaiser Permanente with 1,459+ alumni, UCLA Health with 1,127+ alumni, and Google with 1,058+ alumni.

See also 
 2019 college admissions bribery scandal
 Daily Bruin – UCLA student newspaper

Notes

References

External links

 
 UCLA Athletics website
 Image of UCLA on a zoning map of Los Angeles, 1927 . Los Angeles Times Photographic Archive (Collection 1429). UCLA Library Special Collections, Charles E. Young Research Library, University of California, Los Angeles.

 
Universities and colleges in Los Angeles
Los Angeles
Public universities and colleges in California
Westwood, Los Angeles
Schools accredited by the Western Association of Schools and Colleges
Educational institutions established in 1919
1919 establishments in California
Venues of the 1984 Summer Olympics